In graph theory, a path in an edge-colored graph is said to be rainbow if no color repeats on it. A graph is said to be rainbow-connected (or rainbow colored) if there is a rainbow path between each pair of its vertices. If there is a rainbow shortest path between each pair of vertices, the graph is said to be strongly rainbow-connected (or strongly rainbow colored).

Definitions and bounds 

Clearly, each strong rainbow coloring is also a rainbow coloring, while the converse is not true in general.

Finally, because each strongly rainbow-connected graph is rainbow-connected, we have that .

The following are the extremal cases:
 if and only if  is a complete graph.
 if and only if  is a tree.

The above shows that in terms of the number of vertices, the upper bound  is the best possible in general. The remaining uncolored edges are colored arbitrarily, without introducing new colors. When  is 2-connected, we have that . Moreover, this is tight as witnessed by e.g. odd cycles.

Exact rainbow or strong rainbow connection numbers 
The rainbow or the strong rainbow connection number has been determined for some structured graph classes:
, for each integer , where  is the cycle graph.

Complexity 
The problem of deciding whether  for a given graph  is NP-complete. Because  if and only if , it follows that deciding if  is NP-complete for a given graph .

Variants and generalizations  
Chartrand, Okamoto and Zhang generalized the rainbow connection number as follows. Let  be an edge-colored nontrivial connected graph of order . A -rainbow coloring using  colors is called a minimum -rainbow coloring.

Rainbow connection has also been studied in vertex-colored graphs. This concept was introduced by Krivelevich and Yuster.

See also
Rainbow matching

Notes

References 

.
.
.
.
.
.
.

Graph coloring